The 1954 Colgate Red Raiders football team was an American football team that represented Colgate University as an independent during the 1954 college football season. In its third season under head coach Hal Lahar, the team compiled a 5–2–2 record and outscored opponents by a total of 141 to 117. Richard Lalla was the team captain. The team played its home games at Colgate Athletic Field in Hamilton, New York.

Schedule

References

Colgate
Colgate Raiders football seasons
Colgate Red Raiders football